The 2018 Premier Volleyball League (PVL) season was the second season of the Premier Volleyball League (15th season of the former Shakey's V-League). There were three conferences for this season.

Women's division

Reinforced conference

Participating teams

Preliminary round 
Team standings

Quarterfinals round 
Team standings

Final round

Awards

Final standings

Collegiate conference

Participating teams

Preliminary round 
Team standings

Final round

Awards

Final standings

Open conference

Participating teams

Preliminary round

Final round

Awards

Final standings

Men's division

Reinforced conference

Participating teams

Preliminary round 
 Team standings

Quarterfinals round 
 Team standings

Final round

Awards

Final standings

Collegiate conference

Participating teams

Preliminary round 
Team standings

Final round

Awards

Final standings

Open conference

Participating teams

Preliminary round

Final round

Awards

Final standings

Conference results 

* TBD – to be determined

PVL on Tour 
The Premier Volleyball League’s “PVL on Tour” staged by Sports Vision and Grid Athletic Sports, organizer of the immensely successful Beach Volleyball Republic, the October tour of the PVL marks the first time ever in its storied history that Sports Vision is bringing its games to the countryside. Matches were held in the Bren Z. Guiao Sports Complex in City of San Fernando, Pampanga.

Match results
 All times are in Philippines Standard Time (UTC+08:00)

|}

References

2018 in Philippine sport